Dharani (born V. C. Ramani) is an Indian former film director, who primarily directed Tamil and Telugu action films. He is best known for directing super hit Tamil action films Dhill, Dhool and Ghilli.

Career
He first directed the film Ethirum Pudhirum, loosely based on forest brigand Veerappan and his younger brother's death, starring Mammootty. Political controversies ensured its delayed release in 1999. It received critical acclaim and was awarded second place in the Tamil Nadu State Film Award for Best Film. The film's producer T. Ajay kumar made Dharani the director of his next production, starring Vikram, Dhill. The film was a box-office success and his next film Dhool, produced by A. M. Rathnam in 2003, again with Vikram along with Jyothika and Reemma Sen, was a box office success. He worked with A. M. Rathnam again for the film Ghilli starring Vijay and Trisha, that was a blockbuster movie and a comeback movie in Vijay's career. It was followed by Telugu film Bangaram, featuring Pawan Kalyan in the lead. In 2008, he directed Kuruvi, rejoining the lead cast of Ghilli. Unlike the previous success in Ghilli, Kuruvi was an average hit at the box office and was panned by critics. In 2011, he remade the 2010 Hindi film Dabangg in Tamil as Osthe, with Silambarasan in the lead role, which was again a critical and was declared an average hit.

Dharani announced that he would make a Telugu film titled Merupu with Ram Charan Teja and Kajal Aggarwal, and the film had an official launch in late April 2010. The film progressed slowly throughout 2010 and was later shelved by 2011. .

Filmography

All films are in Tamil, unless otherwise noted.

Singer
"Thaarumaaru" (Uchathula Shiva)

External links

References

Telugu film directors
Tamil film directors
Living people
Year of birth missing (living people)
20th-century Indian film directors
21st-century Indian film directors
Hindi-language film directors
Tamil screenwriters